Richard John Maddern-Williams FRCO (1885 – 1955) was a music teacher and organist based in Norwich.

Life
He was born in Pendeen, Cornwall in 1885 to Edward Stevens Williams and Esther Thomas Maddern. He received his first organ lessons from F. W. Searle of Penzance. At age 16 he entered the Royal College of Music, where he studied under Sir Walter Parratt, Walter Galpin Alcock, F.J. Read and Stevenson Hoyte.

Whilst in Norwich he was Music Master at the Norwich High School for Boys, and also Music Master for the Norwich Pageant in 1912.

In 1942 he was made a bard of the Cornish Gorseth for services to music in Cornwall.

Appointments
Organist at Church of St Cuthbert, Wells 1904 - 1906
Assistant Organist at Wells Cathedral 1904 - 1906
Nave Organist at Wells Cathedral 1906 - 1908
Organist at St Peter Mancroft Norwich 1908 - 1922
Organist at St Peter Mancroft Norwich 1926 - 1941
Organist of St. Paul's Church, Penzance 1941 - 1955?
Conductor of the Penzance Orchestral Society 1942 - 1946

Compositions
He arranged six old Cornish Christmas Carols for men's voices.

He also composed a Magnificat and Nunc Dimittis.

References

1885 births
1955 deaths
English classical organists
British male organists
Cornish composers
Fellows of the Royal College of Organists
Bards of Gorsedh Kernow
20th-century English composers
20th-century organists
20th-century British male musicians
People from St Just in Penwith
Male classical organists